The following elections occurred in the year 1940.

Africa
 1940 South-West African legislative election

Asia
 1940 Philippine special election

Europe
 1940 Moldavian parliamentary election
 1940 Swedish general election

United Kingdom
 1940 Battersea North by-election
 1940 Birmingham Edgbaston by-election
 1940 Bow and Bromley by-election
 1940 City of London by-election
 1940 Croydon North by-election
 1940 Kettering by-election
 1940 Leeds North East by-election
 1940 Middlesbrough West by-election
 1940 Middleton and Prestwich by-election
 1940 Newcastle upon Tyne North by-election
 1940 Nottingham Central by-election
 1940 Preston by-election
 1940 East Renfrewshire by-election
 1940 Rochdale by-election
 1940 Spen Valley by-election
 1940 Swansea East by-election
 1940 Wansbeck by-election

North America
 1940 Mexican general election
 1940 Panamanian general election

Canada
 1940 Canadian federal election
 1940 Alberta general election
 1940 Edmonton municipal election
 1940 Ottawa municipal election
 1940 Toronto municipal election
 1940 Yukon general election

United States
 1940 United States presidential election
 1940 Louisiana gubernatorial election
 1940 Maine gubernatorial election
 1940 Minnesota gubernatorial election
 1940 New Jersey gubernatorial election
 1940 New York state election
 1940 North Carolina gubernatorial election

United States House of Representatives
 1940 United States House of Representatives elections
 United States House of Representatives elections in California, 1940
 United States House of Representatives elections in South Carolina, 1940
 United States House of Representatives elections in Virginia, 1940

United States Senate
 1940 United States Senate elections
 United States Senate election in Arizona, 1940
 United States Senate election in California, 1940
 United States Senate election in Connecticut, 1940
 United States Senate election in Delaware, 1940
 United States Senate election in Florida, 1940
 United States Senate election in Maryland, 1940
 United States Senate election in Massachusetts, 1940
 United States Senate election in Minnesota, 1940
 United States Senate election in Mississippi, 1940
 United States Senate election in Missouri, 1940
 United States Senate election in Montana, 1940
 United States Senate election in New Jersey, 1940
 United States Senate election in New York, 1940
 United States Senate election in Pennsylvania, 1940
 United States Senate election in Vermont, 1940
 United States Senate special election in Vermont, 1940

South America
 1940 Bolivian general election
 1940 Argentine legislative election

Oceania

Australia
 1940 Australian federal election

See also
 :Category:1940 elections

1940
1940 elections
1940 in politics
Elections